Fall from the Sky is the debut album by American singer-songwriter Melissa Greener.  It was produced by Darwin Smith at Cacophony Recorders in Austin, Texas and released on January 18, 2006.

Céline Keating of Acoustic Guitar magazine described it as "strikingly original and impressively varied", featuring "strong, catchy melodies in strange and brooding voicings". She said: "This may be her debut CD, but Melissa Greener is already a pro."

Track listing

References

External links
 

2006 debut albums
Melissa Greener albums